The 2010 Portuguese motorcycle Grand Prix was the penultimate round of the 2010 Grand Prix motorcycle racing season. It took place in the weekend of 29–31 October 2010 at the Autódromo do Estoril located in Estoril, Portugal.

MotoGP classification

Moto2 classification

125 cc classification
The 125cc race was red-flagged after 7 laps due to rain. It was later restarted for 9 laps, with the grid determined by the running order before the suspension. The second part of the race determined the final result.

Championship standings after the race (MotoGP)
Below are the standings for the top five riders and constructors after round seventeen has concluded.

Riders' Championship standings

Constructors' Championship standings

 Note: Only the top five positions are included for both sets of standings.

References

Portuguese motorcycle Grand Prix
Portuguese
Motorcycle Grand Prix